Apparent temperature, also known as feels like, is the temperature equivalent perceived by humans, caused by the combined effects of air temperature, relative humidity and wind speed. The measure is most commonly applied to the perceived outdoor temperature. Apparent temperature was invented by Robert Steadman who published a paper about it in 1984. However, it also applies to indoor temperatures, especially saunas, and when houses and workplaces are not sufficiently heated or cooled.
 The heat index and humidex measure the effect of humidity on the perception of temperatures above . In humid conditions, the air feels much hotter, because less perspiration evaporates from the skin.
 The wind chill factor measures the effect of wind speed on cooling of the human body below . As airflow increases over the skin, more heat will be removed. Standard models and conditions are used.
 The wet-bulb globe temperature (WBGT) combines the effects of radiation (typically sunlight), humidity, temperature and wind speed on the perception of temperature. It is not often used, since its measurement requires the use of a globe thermometer exposed to the sun, which is not included in standard meteorological equipment used in official weather conditions reporting (nor are, in most cases, any other explicit means of measuring solar radiation; temperature measurement takes place entirely in a shade box to avoid direct solar effects). It also does not have an explicit relationship with the perceived temperature a person feels; when used for practical purposes, the WBGT is linked to a category system to estimate the threat of heat-related illness.

These systems, while their exact mechanisms are trade secrets, are believed to estimate the effect of solar radiation based on the available meteorological data that is reported (such as UV index and cloud cover).

See also 
 Equivalent temperature

References 

Atmospheric temperature

Equivalent quantities